Blessed & Cursed is the second full-length album by Devil Sold His Soul, released by Century Media on 12 July 2010. On its first week of release, the album sold over 700 copies. It was the last studio album to feature Iain Trotter on bass, following his departure from the band in January 2011.

Track listing

Personnel 
Devil Sold His Soul
 Ed Gibbs – vocals 
 Ian Trotter – bass guitar 
 Paul Kitney – samples 
 Leks Wood – drums 
 Jonny Renshaw – guitar 
 Rick Chapple – guitar, piano, organ

Additional vocals
 Guest vocals on "The Disappointment" – Andrew Neufeld of Comeback Kid and Sights & Sounds
 Guest vocals on "The Weight of Faith" – Perry Bryan of Rinoa
 Group vocals on "Drowning / Sinking" – Perry Bryan, Jozef Norocky, James May, Matthew Holden and David Gumbleton of Rinoa, Leo Dorsz, Tommy Renshaw and Devil Sold His Soul
 Group vocals on "Truth Has Come" – Devil Sold His Soul

Production
 Produced by Jonny Renshaw and Devil Sold His Soul
 Recorded and Engineered by Jonny Renshaw
 Strings and Brass written and arranged by Devil Sold His Soul
 Strings and Brass programmed by Tommy Renshaw
 Mixing – Steve Evetts
 Mastering – Alan Douches
 Artwork, layout – Jon Barmby

References 

2010 albums
Devil Sold His Soul albums
Century Media Records albums